Holywell Street was a brief, secondary, northern carriageway of part of the Strand, London. It was accordingly subsumed in name when the Strand was widened in 1900. Aside from housing above it was the centre for the sale of romance books and pornography in Victorian London during which time it was known as 'Booksellers' Row'.

References

External links 
James Partleton (1837-1876)
Lost London: a Victorian Street for Friggers and Radicals
Holywell Street and Wych Street, London in 1901

Streets in the City of Westminster
Former streets and roads of London